Alferovo is a rural locality (a village) in Kochmengkskoye Rural Settlement, Kichmengsko-Gorodetsky District, Vologda Oblast, Russia. The population was 97 as of 2002. There are 2 streets.

Geography 
Alferovo is located 24 km northeast of Kichmengsky Gorodok (the district's administrative centre) by road. Kurilovo is the nearest rural locality.

References 

Rural localities in Kichmengsko-Gorodetsky District